The Leica M1 is a 35 mm camera by Leica Camera AG, introduced in 1959. The M1 has a parallax-corrected viewfinder with frames for 35 and 50mm permanently displayed. 9431 were made.

The M1, which followed the original M3 and later M2, was the lowest-cost and simplest Leica M body, a simplified M2 without a rangefinder. It was intended to be used for technical work together with the ground-glass focussing Visoflex, a mirror reflex housing that turns a Leica M into a single-lens reflex camera.

Several similar models were made simultaneously with later M-series Leicas:
 The Leica MD, a simplified M2
 The Leica MDa, a simplified M4
 The Leica MD-2, a simplified M4-2

References

M1
Leica rangefinder cameras

de:Leica M1